NGC 790 is a lenticular galaxy in the constellation Cetus. It is estimated to be 233 million light-years from the Milky Way and has a diameter of approximately 90,000 light years. NGC 790 was discovered on September 10, 1785 by the German-British astronomer William Herschel.

See also 
 List of NGC objects (1–1000)

References

External links 
 

0790
Lenticular galaxies
Cetus (constellation)
007677